Freight Train is a historic slingshot dragster.

Designed by Nye Frank, it used twin supercharged engines and had an aluminum body. When owned by John Peters, running in Top Gas (driven by Bob Muravez) at the 1971 Supernationals, it was painted black and powered by a pair of Chrysler hemis.

Freight Trains best result (driven by Walt Rhodes) was a win at the Gatornationals in 1971.

Notes

Sources
 Taylor, Thom.  "Beauty Beyond the Twilight Zone" in Hot Rod, April 2017, pp. 30–43.
 Taylor, Thom.  "Duel of the Duals" in Hot Rod, April 2017, p. 11.

External links
 The Freight Train (homepage]
 Twotogo (Freight Train page)

1960s cars
Drag racing cars
Rear-wheel-drive vehicles